Pterostylis russellii, commonly known as Russell's greenhood, is a species of orchid endemic to eastern Australia. Non-flowering plants have a rosette of leaves flat on the ground but flowering plants have a single shiny white and dark green flower on a flowering stem lacking a rosette but with a few spreading stem leaves.

Description
The dorsal sepal and petals are fused, forming a hood or "galea" over the column curving forward in a semi-circle. Flowering occurs from April to August.

Taxonomy and naming
Pterostylis russellii was first formally described in 1952 by Trevor Hunt from a specimen collected near Brisbane and the description was published in The Orchid Journal (California). The specific epithet (russellii) honours "Mr. A.J. Russell, then Captain Russell, a keen and competent student of Australian orchids" who first collected this species.

Distribution and habitat
Russell's greenhood grows in moist, shady places in forest between Grafton in New South Wales and Gympie in Queensland.

References

External links 
 

russellii
Endemic orchids of Australia
Orchids of New South Wales
Plants described in 1952